This list of the twenty largest urban areas in China by population in 2010 uses data compiled by the OECD based on its methodology to determine economically linked areas of high population density in China it calls "functional urban areas." It is an adaptation of methodology the OECD uses to determine functional urban areas in OECD member countries. Official Chinese city boundaries cover both urban and rural areas and thus do not necessarily represent the true urban population.

See also 

 List of capitals in China
 List of cities in China
 List of cities in China by population
 List of villages in China
 List of largest cities in the world

References

External links
National Bureau of Statistics of China

Urban agglomerations
China, urban agglomerations
China, urban agglomerations
Urban agglomerations, China
Populated places in China
Urban